Constance Brackman (born 20 October 2001) is a Belgian footballer who plays as a defender for Standard Liège and the Belgium national team.

International career
Brackman made her debut for the Belgium national team on 10 June 2021, coming on as a substitute for Isabelle Iliano against Spain.

References

2001 births
Living people
Women's association football defenders
Belgian women's footballers
Belgium women's international footballers
Standard Liège (women) players
Super League Vrouwenvoetbal players
Belgium women's youth international footballers